Ida Cook (24 August 190422 December 1986) was a British campaigner for Jewish refugees and a romance novelist as Mary Burchell.

Ida Cook and her sister Mary Louise Cook (1901–1991) rescued Jews from the Nazis during the 1930s. The sisters helped 29 people escape, funded mainly by Ida's writing. In 1965, the Cook sisters were honoured as Righteous among the Nations by the Yad Vashem Martyrs and Heroes Remembrance Authority in Israel.

Between 1936 and 1985, under the pseudonym Mary Burchell, Ida Cook wrote 112 romance novels for Mills & Boon — many of which were later republished by Harlequin. She helped to found the Romantic Novelists' Association, serving as its second president from 1966 to 1986.

Biography

Personal life
Ida Cook was born on 24 August 1904 in Sunderland, County Durham, England. With her elder sister Mary Louise Cook (1901–1991), she attended The Duchess's Community High School in Alnwick and later took civil service jobs in London.  Both Ida and her sister, Louise, developed a passionate interest in opera.

During the 1930s, as part of the work they undertook to help Jews to escape from the Nazi regime, the sisters visited Germany on multiple occasions, using their genuine enthusiasm for opera as a cover for their frequent travel and smuggled Jewish people's jewellery and other valuables into England, thereby enabling Jews fleeing Germany to satisfy British financial security requirements for immigration. They worked with Austrian conductor Clemens Krauss and his wife, the soprano Viorica Ursuleac, who had initially told them of the persecution of the Jews. The sisters helped 29 people escape, funded mainly by Ida's writing. In 1965 the Cook sisters were honoured as Righteous among the Nations by the Yad Vashem Martyrs and Heroes Remembrance Authority in Israel. In 2010 the British Government named each of them a British Hero of the Holocaust.

Writing career
In 1936 Ida published her first romance novels as Mary Burchell. During her career she wrote 112 romances for Mills & Boon, later re-edited by Harlequin Books, including the famous Warrender Saga, a series about the opera and concert-hall world. She incorporated many famous operas (Otello, Eugene Onegin and Carmen, among others) into the Warrender series plots. She wrote in the Romantic Novelists' Association's newsletter:

In 1950 she published her autobiography, We Followed Our Stars. In 2008 it was re-issued, re-edited and expanded as Safe Passage.

She ghost-wrote Tito Gobbi's autobiography, My Life and was the subject of This Is Your Life in 1956 when she was surprised by Eamonn Andrews at the BBC Television Theatre.

Legacy 

In January 2017 Sunderland Council erected a memorial commemorating the sisters on the site of their childhood home at 37 Croft Avenue, Sunderland.

In 2021, investigative journalist Isabel Vincent published Two Against Hitler: The True Story of Two Courageous Sisters, a Rescue Mission in the Third Reich, and Opera, about the Cook sisters. In 2017 producer Donald Rosenfeld discussed plans to make a film of the sisters' humanitarian work and his efforts to unseal CIA files on their activities. The film was to be based on the research by Vincent.

An episode of the documentary series Mysteries at the Museum featured the sisters' activities in rescuing Jews from Nazi Germany.

Bibliography

Burchell's works include:

As Mary Burchell

Single novels
Wife to Christopher,	1936
Except my Love,	1937
Nobody Asked Me,	1937
But Not For Me,	1938
Other Lips Have Loved You (later republished as Two Loves Have I),	1938
With all my Worldly goods,	1938
Yet Love Remains,	1938
After Office Hours,	1939
Little Sister,	1939
One of the Family,	1939
Such is Love,	1939
I'll Go With You,	1940
Pay Me Tomorrow,	1940
Yours With Love,	1940
Accompanied by his Wife,	1941
Always Yours,	1941
Just a Nice Girl,	1941
Strangers May Marry,	1941
Love Made the Choice,	1942
Thine Is My Heart,	1942
Where Shall I Wander? (later republished as Bargain Wife),	1942
Dare I Be Happy?,	1943
My Old Love Came,	1943
Dearly Beloved,	1944
Take Me with You,	1944
Thanks to Elizabeth,	1944
Away Went Love,	1945
Meant for Each Other,	1945
Find Out the Way,	1946
First Love-Last Love,	1946
Wife by Arrangement,	1946
Not Without You,	1947
Under Joint Management,	1947
Ward of Lucifer,	1947
If You Care,	1948
The Brave in Heart	1948
Then Come Kiss Me,	1948
Choose Which You Will,	1949
I Will Love You Still,	1949
If This Were All,	1949
Wish on the Moon,	1949
A Letter for Don,	1950
At First Sight,	1950
Love Him or Leave Him,	1950
Here I Belong,	1951
Mine for a Day,	1951
Tell Me My Fortune,	1951
Over the Blue Mountains,	1952
Stolen Heart,	1952
Sweet Adventure,	1952
A Ring on Her Finger,	1953
No Real Relation,	1953
The Heart Cannot Forget,	1953
The Heart Must Choose	1953
Meet Me Again (later republished as Nurse Allison's Trust),	1954
Under the Stars of Paris,	1954
When Love's Beginning,	1954
The Prettiest Girl,	1955
Yours to Command,	1955
For Ever and Ever,	1956
Loving is Giving,	1956
On the Air,	1956
To Journey Together,	1956
And Falsely Pledge My Love,	1957
It's Rumoured in the Village,	1957
Joanna at the Grange,	1957
Love is my Reason,	1957
Loyal in All (later republished as Nurse Marika, Loyal in All,	1957
Dear Sir	1958
Dear Trustee,	1958
Hospital Corridors,	1958
The Girl in the Blue Dress,	1958
Honey,	1959
Star Quality (later republished as Surgeon of Distinction),	1959
Across the Counter,	1960
Choose the One You'll Marry,	1960
Corner House,	1960
Paris-and my love,	1960
My Sister Celia,	1961
Reluctant Relation,	1961
The Wedding Dress,	1961
House of Conflict,	1962
Inherit My Heart,	1962
Dangerous Loving,	1963
Sweet Meadows,	1963
Do Not Go, My Love,	1964/01
The Strange Quest of Anne Weston (later republished as The Strange Quest of Nurse Anne),	1964
Girl With a Challenge,	1965
Her Sister's Children,	1965
The Other Linding Girl,	1966
Cinderella After Midnight,	1967
The Marshall Family,	1967
Though Worlds Apart,	1967
Missing from Home,	1968
A Home for Joy,	1969
The Rosewood Box,	1970
Call and I'll Come,	1970
Second Marriage,	1971
One Man's Heart	1971

The Warrender Saga
A Song Begins,	1965    (Otello)
The Broken Wing (later republished as Damaged Angel),	1966    (excerpts Così fan tutte, Semiramide, Norma (opera))
When Love is Blind,	1967    (Beethoven's 3rd Concerto)
The Curtain Rises,	1969    (The Magic Flute)
Child of Music,	1971
Music of the Heart,	1972
Unbidden Melody,	1973	(Eugene Onegin)
Song Cycle,	1974	
Remembered Serenade,	1975	(L'amore dei tre re)
Elusive Harmony,	1976	(Carmen, Otello, André Chénier)
Nightingales,	1980    (Mendolssohn's Elijah)
Masquerade with Music,	1982    (I Pagliacci))
On Wings of Song,	1985    (Alceste, Suor Angelica)

Omnibus collections
3 Great Novels: Take Me With You; Choose Which You Will; Meant for Each Other (1975)
3 Great Novels: The Heart Cannot Forget; Ward of Lucifer; A Home for Joy
3 Great Novels: The Other Linding Girl; Girl with a Challenge; My Sister Celia
It's Rumored in the Village / Except My Love / Strangers May Marry (1983)

Anthologies in collaboration
Golden Harlequin Library Vol. VIII: Choose The One You'll Marry / Sweet Barbary / Senior Surgeon at St. David's (1970) (with Pamela Kent and Elizabeth Gilzean)
Golden Harlequin Library XLI: Over The Blue Mountains; Summer Lightning; Lucy Lamb; Doctor's Wife (1973) (with Sara Seale and Jill Tahourdin)
Tell Me My Fortune / A Scent Of Lemons / Country Of The Wine (1979) (with Jill Christian and Mary Wibberley)
Harlequin Classic Library (1980) (with Elizabeth Hoy, Alex Stuart, Susan Barrie, Juliet Shore, Jean S. MacLeod, Elizabeth Houghton and Jill Tahourdin)
Just a Nice Girl / Pride of Madeira / Valley of Paradise (1983) (with Elizabeth Hunter and Margaret Rome)
The Hills of Maketu / Under the Stars of Paris / Every Wise Man (1986) (with Gloria Bevan and Jacqueline Gilbert)

As Ida Cook

Non-fiction
We Followed Our Stars (1950), re-released as Safe Passage (2008) and later The Bravest Voices (2021) (autobiography)

References and sources

External links 
 Extensive biographical article in Granta

1904 births
1986 deaths
English romantic fiction writers
People from Sunderland
20th-century English novelists
British Righteous Among the Nations
Pseudonymous women writers
20th-century English women writers
20th-century pseudonymous writers